The 26th Annual American Music Awards on January 11, 1999, at the Shrine Auditorium in Los Angeles. The awards recognized the most popular artists and albums from the year 1998.

Performances

Presenters
 Brandy and Melissa Joan Hart (hosts) – opened the show and presented Favorite Soul/R&B Album
 Will Smith – introduced Whitney Houston
 Monica and NSYNC – presented Favorite Country Album
 Deborah Cox and Issac Hayes – presented Favorite Adult Contemporary Artist
 Freddie Prinze Jr. and Tatyana Ali – presented Favorite Rap/Hip-Hop Artist
 LeAnn Rimes and David Boreanaz – presented Favorite Country Band, Duo or Group
 Sinbad and The Kinleys – presented Favorite Pop/Rock New Artist
 Faith Evans and Everclear – introduced Blondie, Coolio and Wu-Tang Clan
 Kathy Kinney and Sugar Ray – presented Favorite Soul/R&B Band, Duo or Group
 Garth Brooks – presented the Award of Merit to Billy Joel
 Kiss – presented Favorite Pop/Rock Album
 Boy George and Vonda Shepard – presented Favorite Soundtrack
 Paula Abdul – introduced Cher
 Toby Keith and Randy Travis – presented Favorite Country New Artist
 Carmen Electra and Dru Hill – presented Favorite Soul/R&B New Artist
 Shawn Mullins and Laura Innes – presented Favorite Pop/Rock Band, Duo or Group
 Donny and Marie Osmond – announced The Winners Of The Concert From The Previous Year
 Chaka Khan and Method Man – presented Favorite Alternative Artist
 Britney Spears – introduced The Goo Goo Dolls
 The Wilkinsons – presented Favorite Country Male Artist
 Jack Wagner and Steve Wariner – presented Favorite Country Female Artist
 Daisy Fuentes, Shawn Wayans and Marlon Wayans – presented Favorite Soul/R&B Male Artist
 Snoop Dogg and Bill Maher – presented Favorite Soul/R&B Female Artist
 Gerald Levert and Tia and Tamera Mowry – presented Favorite Pop/Rock Male Artist
 Enrique Iglesias – presented Favorite Pop/Rock Female Artist

Winners and nominees

References
 http://www.rockonthenet.com/archive/1999/amas.htm

1999